Kale ('Beauty') or Cale; Kalleis (Calleis), in ancient Greek religion, was one of the Charites (Graces), daughters of Zeus (Jupiter). Cale is the spouse of Hephaestus according to some authors (although most have Aphrodite play that role). Cale was also known as Charis and Aglaea.

Mythology 
The name Cale in this passage has led some to conclude that Homer mentions two Charites, Pasithea and Cale, which seems to be a forced separation of three words: Pasi thea cale, meaning ‘the goddess who is beautiful to all men’.

Sostratus (Eustath. ad Hom. p. 1665) relates that Aphrodite and the three Charites, Pasithea, Cale and Euphrosyne, disputed about their beauty with one another, and when Teiresias awarded the prize to Cale he was changed by Aphrodite into an old woman, but Cale rewarded him with a beautiful head of hair and took him to Crete.

References 

Greek goddesses
Children of Zeus
Beauty goddesses